Mattia Lanzano (born 4 July 1990) is an Italian professional footballer who plays as a goalkeeper.

Club career

Early career
Lanzano began his professional career with Piacenza Calcio, but doesn't make an appearance for the Biancorossi during his career with the Serie B side.

In July 2009 Lanzano left Piacenza Calcio on loan to Lega Pro level for U.S. Poggibonsi before moving in June 2010 for U.S. Gavorrano the following season.

Swindon Town F.C.
On 4 July 2011, Lanzano was confirmed as Paolo Di Canio's fifth summer signing for Swindon Town by signing a two-year contract and joining fellow Italian footballers Alberto Comazzi, Alessandro Cibocchi and Raffaele De Vita at the Wiltshire club. Lanzano will take number 1 shirt.

On 24 August 2011, Lanzano made his debut for the club in a 1–0 win over Bristol City in the League Cup, keeping a clean sheet on his debut and he made another appearance in the League Cup on 30 August 2011 in a 3–1 loss against Southampton. Lanzano made his debut in League in a 3–2 win over Rotherham United.
In a 2–0 win over Southend United, keeping his first clean sheet in the league. His good performance against Southend United earned him a "League Two - Team of the Week".

Fokikos F.C.
In August 2013, Lanzano moved to Greece where has signed a one-year contract with the club of Amfissa Fokikos F.C. that plays in Football League and he will take number 28 shirt.
On 30 September 2013, made his debut in the Greek Football League for the club in a 2–2 draw over Kallithea F.C. and on 24 October 2013 in Greek Football Cup against Olympiacos F.C.

F.C. Grosseto
In August 2015 Lanzano signed a contract for his birthplace club F.C. Grosseto.
At the end of the season, Lanzano extended his contract with F.C. Grosseto for another year until 2017.

International career

U-17
Lanzano was a regular for the Italy under-17 side during the team's 2007 UEFA European Under-17 Football Championship qualification campaign, under manager Luca Gotti, debuting against Andorra.

U-19
Lanzano also received a call-up to the Italy U-19 from manager Massimo Piscedda, for a team for training camp held at Borghesiana.

Honours
Swindon Town
 League Two: Champions 2011–12

Individual

League Two Team of the Week (1): 12/09/11

References

External links
 
 
 

1990 births
Living people
Italian footballers
Piacenza Calcio 1919 players
U.S. Poggibonsi players
U.S. Gavorrano players
Swindon Town F.C. players
English Football League players
Italian expatriate footballers
Expatriate footballers in England
People from Grosseto
Association football goalkeepers
Sportspeople from the Province of Grosseto
Footballers from Tuscany